Kashinath Ghanekar (14 August 1930 - 2 March 1986) was a popular stage actor and dental surgeon.

Early life
Ghanekar was born in the Chiplun and did his schooling and higher studies in Chiplun, Maharashtra, India.

Personal life
He married twice. He was married to Irawati M. Bhide, a gynaecologist and obstetrician. His first marriage was childless and ended in divorce. He subsequently married a much younger Kanchan, the daughter of Marathi actress Sulochana Latkar. This marriage was harmonious, and after his death, Kanchan penned a biography titled Nath Ha Maza, meaning "such was my husband."

Career
Ghanekar was the first superstar of the Marathi stage with a lot of glamour, and he was the highest paid star from the years 1960 to 1980.  He appeared in Marathi films in the 1960s. In addition to Marathi stage and movies, he appeared in Hindi movies such as Abhilasha opposite Nanda and Dadi Maa where he played the role of the son of Ashok Kumar and Bina Rai.

The role that made him a popular actor was that of Sambhaji in the play "Raigadala Jevha Jaag Yete" (When Raigad awakens) written by the play writer, Vasant Kanetkar. Most notable character ever played by him was "Lalya"  in the play Ashroonchi Zhali Phule. Some of the other noted plays he acted in are - Ithe Oshalala Mrutyu, Garambicha Bapu, Anandi Gopal, Shitu, Tujhe Aahe Tujpashi, Sundar Mi Honar, Madhumanjiri etc.

The film Madhuchandra (in 1968) made Ghanekar, a noted stage actor, a major Marathi film star.
One of his most popular films in Marathi is the mystery movie Ha Khel Savlyancha with Asha Kale.

Death and legacy
Ghanekar died of a heart attack during one of the tours of his plays, at his hotel room at Amravati.

 The Dr. Kashinath Ghanekar Natyagruha, a modern theater with an auditorium, was built by the Thane Municipal Corporation.
 In November 2018, Ani... Dr. Kashinath Ghanekar a Marathi-language feature film was released; starring Subodh Bhave as Dr Ghanekar, Sonali Kulkarni, Sumeet Raghavan, Vaidehi Parashurami, Prasad Oak, Nandita Dhuri, Anand Ingale and Mohan Joshi in prominent roles. It is a biographical drama directed by Abhijeet Deshpande.

Theatre
Below is a list of stage plays where Ghanekar played a significant role. Year mentioned is when the Play was first performed on a public stage.

Filmography

References

Male actors in Marathi cinema
1930 births
1986 deaths
Marathi actors